The Maryland Science Center, located in Baltimore's Inner Harbor, opened to the public in 1976. It includes three levels of exhibits, a planetarium, and an observatory. It was one of the original structures that drove the revitalization of the Baltimore Inner Harbor from its industrial roots to a thriving downtown destination. In 1987, an IMAX theater was added, but the museum continued to show its age as the end of the 20th century approached. In May 2004, a large addition to the property was opened, and the modernized hands-on exhibits now include more than two dozen dinosaur skeletons. Subjects that the center displays include physical science, space, and the human body.

Maryland Science Center won a 2006 Best of Baltimore award for "Best Place to Take Kids." In 2008, the Maryland Science Center was named one of the “10-Best Science Centers for Families” by Parent's magazine.

Exhibits
Dinosaur Mysteries
This exhibit includes full scale, full body models of two dinosaurs — Astrodon (Maryland's state dinosaur) and Acrocanthosaurus — and full scale replica skeletons of Giganotosaurus, Albertosaurus, Tyrannosaurus, Herrerasaurus, Tarbosaurus, and Compsognathus. It also includes a section where guests can go on a mock paleontological dig to uncover an Iguanodon skeleton.
Newton's Alley
This exhibit features hands-on physical science related demonstrations including a "Bernoulli blower," "inertia table," and other similar things.
Science & Main
Visitors can solve challenges and explore physics such as flying a paper airplane and building with large blocks.
Science Aglow
This exhibit allows guests to experiment with the optics and physics of light.
You – The Inside Story
This exhibit shows guests what senses the inside of the human body is used. It includes a bed of nails which guests can try out.
SciLab
A laboratory for 8 to 9-year-old children, where they can conduct science experiments.
Our Place in Space
Shows guests different aspects of the solar system, the galaxy, and the universe. It features a revolutionary new piece of technology designed by NOAA called Science on a Sphere. Live presentations on Earth and space are offered daily on the sphere. The Davis Planetarium is also located within this exhibit.
Power Up
This exhibit shows guests how electric energy is used in everyday lives.
Math in Nature
This exhibit features interactive activities that shows how nature relies on math.
The Kids Room
A room for children 8 and younger and their families, which includes a water table, a mock ship, and other activities for young children.
The Shed
A Do it yourself workshop where visitors can create inventive objects.
The Demonstration Stage
The Demo stage features live science demonstrations including ones about inertia, static electricity, liquid nitrogen, chemical reactions, combustion reactions, space technology, and other topics.
SpaceLink
The SpaceLink offers visitors a chance to find out the latest news on space. Visitors can ask exhibit staff questions about upcoming satellite missions and much more .

Gallery

Awards and Scholarships for Maryland Residents

The Maryland Science Center annually recognizes and celebrates scientific research and academic achievement through the following scholarship and awards offered to outstanding Maryland residents:

 Dr. H. Bently Glass Scholarship
 Maryland’s Outstanding Young Scientist Award
 Maryland’s Outstanding Young Engineer Award
 Maryland’s Outstanding STEM Educator Award

References

External links
Maryland Science Center

Maryland Science Center on Google Street View

1976 establishments in Maryland
Inner Harbor, Baltimore
Museums in Baltimore
Natural history museums in Maryland
Science museums in Maryland
Museums established in 1976
Federal Hill, Baltimore
Dinosaur museums in the United States
Paleontology in Maryland